Hugh of Briel, in older literature Hugh of Bruyères, was a French knight and the second lord of the Barony of Karytaina in the Principality of Achaea, in Frankish Greece.

Hailing from Briel-sur-Barse in the French province of Champagne, Hugh inherited the Barony of Karytaina sometime around 1222 from his brother, Renaud of Briel. Hugh married Alice of Villehardouin, a daughter of the Prince of Achaea, Geoffrey I of Villehardouin. Hugh of Briel died in early 1238, not yet forty years old, and was succeeded by his son Geoffrey.

References

Sources
 
 

1238 deaths
Barons of Karytaina
Medieval Arcadia
People from Aube
Year of birth unknown